The 2005–06 Segunda Divisão season was the 72nd season of the competition and the 56th season of recognised third-tier football in Portugal.

Overview
The league was contested by 58 teams in 4 divisions with CD Trofense, AD Lousada, UD Oliveirense and CD Olivais e Moscavide winning the respective divisional competitions and progressing to the championship playoffs.  The overall championship was won by CD Olivais e Moscavide and the runners-up CD Trofense were also promoted to the Liga de Honra.

League standings

Série A

Série B

Série C

Série D

Championship playoffs

Semi-finals

Final
The final was played on 28 May 2006 in Marinha Grande.

Footnotes

External links
 Portuguese Division Two «B» – footballzz.co.uk

Portuguese Second Division seasons
Port
3